Charles-Edward Amory Winslow (February 4, 1877 – January 8, 1957) was an American bacteriologist and public health expert who was, according to the Encyclopedia of Public Health, "a seminal figure in public health, not only in his own country, the United States, but in the wider Western world."

Winslow was born in Boston, Massachusetts and attended Massachusetts Institute of Technology (M.I.T.), obtaining a B.S. in 1898 and an M.S. in 1910.

He began his career as a bacteriologist. He met Anne Fuller Rogers when they were students in William T. Sedgwick's laboratory at M.I.T., and married her in 1907. He taught at the Massachusetts Institute of Technology while heading the sewage experiment station from 1908 to 1910, then taught at the College of the City of New York from 1910 to 1914.

He was the youngest charter member of the Society of American Bacteriologists when that organization was founded in 1899. With Samuel Cate Prescott he published the first American textbook on the elements of water bacteriology.

In 1915 he founded the Yale Department of Public Health within the Yale Medical School, and he was professor and chairman of the Department until he retired in 1945. (The Department became the Yale School of Public Health after accreditation was introduced in 1947.) During a time dominated by discoveries in bacteriology, he emphasized a broader perspective on causation, adopting a more holistic perspective. The department under his direction was a catalyst for health reform in Connecticut. He was the first director of Yale's J.B. Pierce Laboratory, serving from 1932 to 1957. Winslow was also instrumental in founding the Yale School of Nursing.

He was the first Editor-in-Chief of the Journal of Bacteriology, serving in that position from 1916 to 1944. He was also the editor of the American Journal of Public Health from 1944 to 1954. He was the curator of public health at the American Museum of Natural History from 1910 to 1922. In 1926 he became president of the American Public Health Association, and in the 1950s was a consultant to the World Health Organization.

"Public health" definition, as per Charles-Edward Amory Winslow 
His definition, still relevant at the twenty-first century, was published in1920 in Science: "Public health is the science and the art of preventing disease, prolonging life, and promoting physical health and efficiency through organized community efforts for the sanitation of the environment, the control of community infections, the education of the individual in principles of personal hygiene, the organization of medical and nursing service for the early diagnosis and preventive treatment of disease, and the development of the social machinery which will ensure to every individual in the community a standard of living adequate for the maintenance of health. (...) I look to see our health departments in the coming years organizing diverse forms of sanitary and medical and nursing and social service in such fashion as to enable every citizen to realize his birthright of health and longevity."

CEA Winslow Award

The C.-E.A. Winslow Award is presented to a public health professional that has demonstrated leadership and achievement in practice, research and /or education. The award commemorates Charles-Edward Amory Winslow (1877-1957), a pioneer in public health and medicine, who is credited with founding the second oldest school of public health in the country at Yale University. Among the most widely quoted health leaders during his lifetime, Dr. Winslow believed that equal in weight with scientific ideas about health and disease was a commitment to social justice – that social ills must be the first conquest in the "conquest of epidemic disease.”

 
C.-E.A Winslow Award Recipients (1955-2015)
 
1955 - Friend Lee Mickle
1956 - CT PH Nursing Agencies Board
1957 - Ira V. Hiscock and Stanley H. Osborn
1958 - Elizabeth Gordon Fox
1959 - M. Allen Pond
1960 - Alfred Burgdorf
1961 - John R. Paul
1962 - Hazel V. Dudley
1963 - Martha Clifford
1964 - Louis J. Dumont
1965 - Leonard F. Menczer
1966 - Warren J. Scott
1967 - Franklin M. Foote
1968 - Edward M. Cohart
1969 - Leonard Parente
1970 - Wilbur Johnston
1971 - Florence Austin
1972 - Mrs. Chase Going Woodhouse
1973 - Edwin Meiss
1974 - James Hart
1975 - Barbara Christine
1976 - Adrian Ostfield
1977 - Estelle Siker
1978 - Fred Adams
1979 - J. Wister Meigs
1981 - Robert W. McCollum
1984 - I. S. Falk
1985 - George Silver
1986 - Ralph Gofstein	
1987 - Alvin Novik
1988 - Martha Leonard
1989 - Elizabeth Bellis
1990 - Ruth Abbott
1991 - Roslyn U. Fishman
1992 - John Glasgow
1994 - Susan Addiss
1995 - James F. Jekel
1996 - Virginia S. Humphrey
1997 - James L. Hadler
1998 - Cornell Scott/Katrina Clark
1999 - Holger Hansen
2000 - Richard F. Straub
2001 - Marge Nelligan
2002 - Alfreda Turner
2003 - Elaine O'Keefe
2004 - Paul M. Shur
2005 - Joan Segal
2006 - Ruth N. Knollmueller
2007 - Katherine A. Kelley
2008 - Elaine Anderson
2009 - Michael J. Perlin
2010 - Baker Salsbury
2011 - Shelley Diehl Geballe
2012 - Patricia J. Checko
2014 - William G. Faraclas
2015 - Jeannette Ickovics 
2016 - Debbie Humphries
2017 - Jennifer Kertanis

CEA Winslow The Translator
In 1896, he translated, from German, « Heimat », a play in four acts by Hermann Sudermann, renamed « Magda » and played by Henry Stephenson and Charles Waldron  in a Broadway theatre production in New York City, New York.

Monographs
Winslow wrote nearly 600 articles and books on bacteriology, public health, sanitation, and health care administration. Among the more significant are:
The Evolution and Significance of the Modern Public Health Campaign (1923)
The Conquest of Epidemic Disease (1943)
The History of American Epidemiology (1952).

References

External links
 Charles-Edward Amory Winslow papers (MS 749). Manuscripts and Archives, Yale University Library. 
 
 
 Bibliography

1877 births
1957 deaths
American microbiologists
Yale University faculty
Massachusetts Institute of Technology alumni
Environmental health practitioners
Léon Bernard Foundation Prize laureates